Valeriia  Shashenok (born 17 July 2001) is a Ukrainian photographer who has garnered international attention for her satirical TikTok videos documenting the 2022 invasion of Ukraine.

Life during the war 
Shashenok, who is from Chernihiv, Ukraine, worked as a freelance photographer. From 24 February 2022 to the week of 13 March, Shashenok lived in a bomb shelter, where she documented her family's survival techniques in a comedic manner and the destruction of her hometown (which is on the border of Russia and Belarus), whereas her friends had fled to countries including Bulgaria and Italy. Her most prominent video featuring the Sicilian song "C'è la luna mezzo mare", which went viral internationally and has accrued over 28 million views. She had previously used TikTok for local businesses and her personal life, but her chronicles of the war started gaining traction when she used English captions. She posted about the war to dispel negative stereotypes about Ukraine and its people, as well as to combat fake news narratives in Russian state media.

In mid-March, she escaped alone to Poland, while her parents have stayed in Ukraine. According to her account, she went from Kyiv to Lviv, then from Lviv to Poland's Przemyśl; although she lacked her passport, she used documents from Ukraine's Diia app and was allowed into the country. From Przemyśl, she traveled to Warsaw via Łódź and was interviewed by a Polish journalist from Telewizja Polska who recognized her at a train stop. During this journey, she was also interviewed by CNN en Español, Cosmopolitan Italia, and la Repubblica. Shashenok is presently a refugee in Italy.

References 

2001 births
Living people
People from Chernihiv
Ukrainian photographers
Ukrainian women photographers
Ukrainian LGBT people
Ukrainian refugees
LGBT TikTokers
People of the 2022 Russian invasion of Ukraine
21st-century women photographers
LGBT photographers
Ukrainian atheists